Daniella Evangelista (born September 20, 1982) is a Canadian actress and model.

Biography 

Her early work in television commercials and modeling included national campaigns for Benetton and worldwide exposure through Japanese calendars and other promotions. She was also profiled on the front of the popular Italian teen magazine "Bambini".

She was a coprotagonist on teen drama Edgemont as Tracy Antonelli from 2001 to 2005 and voices Kana in Hamtaro and Asuka Sakurai in the animated series Soultaker in 2002.

In 2000, she appeared in the beginning of Cabin by the Lake, a made for television horror/thriller movie starring Judd Nelson. She portrayed the character "Kimberley Parsons" who was kidnapped and later murdered. She was credited in the sequel, Return to Cabin by the Lake in 2001.

In 2003, she appeared in Nickelback's music video "Someday".

Filmography

Film

Television

References

External links
 
 
 

1982 births
Actresses from Vancouver
Canadian film actresses
Canadian television actresses
Canadian voice actresses
Living people